Middleton Albert "Al" Parker (born December 22, 1968) is a former professional tennis player from the United States.

Early life
Parker attended Pinewood Christian Academy, where his tennis talents were recognized during middle school.

Career

Juniors
Parker won 25 USTA titles during his junior career. He made the boys' quarterfinals at the 1985 US Open and was runner-up to Javier Sánchez in the 1986 Orange Bowl (18s).

Pro tour and college tennis
He twice appeared in the men's singles draw of the US Open, in 1986, when he lost in the opening round to 13th seed Anders Järryd and 1987, when he lost a four set first round match to Tarik Benhabiles. He was a silver medalist at the 1987 Pan American Games and was a finalist at a Raleigh Challenger tournament in the same year.

Parker played collegiate tennis at the University of Georgia and reached the NCAA Division One singles semifinals in 1988. He was named the Academic All-American of the Year in 1990-91.

In the early 1990s he played professionally but was constantly hampered by injuries.

After his career, he earned a MBA from Harvard Business School.

References

1968 births
Living people
American male tennis players
Tennis people from Georgia (U.S. state)
Georgia Bulldogs tennis players
Tennis players at the 1987 Pan American Games
Sportspeople from Savannah, Georgia
People from Claxton, Georgia
Pan American Games medalists in tennis
Pan American Games silver medalists for the United States
Medalists at the 1987 Pan American Games
20th-century American people
Harvard Business School alumni